The District Council of Grant is a local government area located in the Limestone Coast region of South Australia, and is the southernmost council in the state.

The council was formed on 1 July 1996 after the amalgamation of the District Council of Mount Gambier and the District Council of Port MacDonnell, and currently surrounds the City of Mount Gambier. The economy of the district is based on agriculture, forestry and fishing.

The council seat and administration offices are outside the council boundaries in Mount Gambier, while it maintains a branch office in Port MacDonnell.

Geography

The council includes the towns and localities of Allendale East, Blackfellows Caves, Canunda, Cape Douglas, Caroline, Carpenter Rocks, Caveton, Compton, Dismal Swamp, Donovans, Eight Mile Creek, German Creek, Kongorong, Mil-Lel, Mingbool, Moorak, Mount Schank, Nene Valley, Pelican Point, Pleasant Park, Port MacDonnell, Racecourse Bay, Square Mile, Tarpeena, Wandilo, Wye and  Yahl, and parts of Burrungule, Glenburnie, OB Flat, Suttontown, Tantanoola, Wepar and Worrolong.

History

The District Council of Mount Gambier
Local government in Mount Gambier was established in 1863, when the District Council of Mount Gambier met for the first time, and Edward Wehl was elected the inaugural chairman.
In December 1864 the District Council of Mount Gambier was divided into the District Council of Mount Gambier West (Town Council) and the District Council of Mount Gambier East. In May 1876 another division occurred resulting in the formation of the first town council with John Watson as Mayor.

The three local governments operated independently up until 1932 when the District Council of Mount Gambier West and District Council of Mount Gambier East were merged to once again be united under the banner of the District Council of Mount Gambier.
The town council never merged back, instead becoming what is now the City of Mount Gambier.

The District Council of Port MacDonnell
Land around Port MacDonnell was taken up by pastoralists as early as the 1840s. Settlement started in the 1850s.

By the end of the 1860s there were enough people in town and surrounding smaller settlements to warrant the proclamation of the District Council of Port MacDonnell.

With Port MacDonnell being the second largest port in South Australia, the population held steady until the decision was made not to connect the port to the newly south east railway network. This resulted in loss of trade, and declining populations in the town.

The two councils merged in 1996 to form the District Council of Grant.

Economy
The economy of the district relies on a range of industries, including agriculture, fishing, forestry and tourism.

Cereal crops and horticulture dominate many agricultural areas in the district, with beef, dairy and sheep production also prominent activities.

The fishing industry in  Port MacDonnell is mostly reliant on the rock lobster industry, as well as certain scalefish, and is a significant factor in the economy of the area.

Forestry production and related secondary industries of logging, milling and paper production are major economic and employment generating activities.

Tourists are attracted to the district by natural features such as the coastline, the Canunda National Park and Lake Bonney SE as well as the European heritage making the area a popular and growing tourist destination. A niche tourism activity is cave diving in the water-filled caves and sinkholes present in the council's area as well of those of the City of Mount Gambier and the Wattle Range Council.  This activity attracts cave divers from around the globe.  Popular sites within the council's area include Ewens Ponds and Piccaninnie Ponds.

During autumn, many visitors also arrive to take advantage of the run of bluefin tuna along the coast, with fish caught out over the edge of the continental shelf.

Councillors

The District Council of Grant has a directly elected mayor.

See also

Mount Gambier Airport
Little Blue Lake
List of parks and gardens in rural South Australia
List of state heritage places in the District Council of Grant

References

External links
Council page

Grant
Limestone Coast